飯, meaning "cooked rice", may refer to:
Rice in Chinese cuisine
Meshi, rice in Japanese cuisine

See also

Bap (food) (rice in Korean cuisine), which is a native Korean word rather than a Sino-Korean word
Rice dishes in Vietnamese cuisine, called , which is a native Vietnamese word rather than a Sino-Vietnamese word